Hindol is a town and subdivision in Dhenkanal district of the Indian state of Odisha.

Geography 
It was a part of the Hindol princely state before independence.

Festivals 
Hindol hosts five festivals every year, of which three are major. The most important of these is the Rath Yatra.

Harihat Mahotsav  

Harihat Mahotsav is the oldest carnival of Hindol. The original name Harihat Mela was converted to Harihat Mahotsav in 2016. But Harihat Mela was an ancient traditional carnival of Hindol that was started many years before the Twentieth Yatra.

Hindol Laxmi Puja Committee 
Hindol Town 15 Laxmi Puja Committees.
 Radhakrushna Laxmi Puja Committee, Nutanpatana
 Bus Stand Laxmi Puja Committee, Amalapada
 Maudamani Laxmi Puja Committee, Post Office
 Medical Choka Laxmi Puja Committee
 Kalapana Bazar Laxmi Puja Committee
 Mera Bazar Laxmi Puja Committee
 Karigar Sahi Laxmi Puja Committee
 Satya Sahi Laxmi Puja Committee, Nutanpatana-A
 Gopala Sahi Laxmi Puja Committee, Nutanpatana-B
 Banamalipur Laxmi Puja Committee
 Pitabali Laxmi Puja Committee
 Gopalapur Laxmi Puja Committee-A
 Gopalapur Laxmi Puja Committee-B
 Radhanathapura Laxmi Puja Committee
 Champati Sahi Laxmi Puja Committee

Governance
Hindol is an Odisha Legislative Assembly (Vidhan Sabha) constituency within the Dhenkanal parliamentary (Lok Sabha) constituency.

History 
Hindol was founded from Dudurkote (established before 800 AD) in 1554 by two brothers named Lakshman Mahratta and Bharat Mahratta. They belonged to the family of the Khimedi Raja of Ganjam, which also ruled over areas in the Madras region. After the East India Company occupied Odisha in September–October 1803, treaties were signed with estates of the region, including Hindol.

Rulers

Sarbarakar & Royal Responsibilities 

Hindol was the home to the Hindol princely state with the Odisha States Agency during the British Raj. After the East India Company occupied Odisha from September to October in 1803, treaties were signed with estates of the region, including Hindol. After Independence, the state merged into the Republic of India in 1947. Thereafter in 1948, when all the princely states including Dhenkanal, Talcher, Athmallik, Pal Lahara and Hindol formally merged with the province of Odisha, the present-day Dhenkanal district was created.

References 

Cities and towns in Dhenkanal district